The Bone Man (German: Der Knochenmann) is a 2009 Austrian film directed by Wolfgang Murnberger. The script is based on the novel The Bone Man by Austrian author Wolf Haas.

Cast 
 Josef Hader - Simon Brenner
 Birgit Minichmayr - Birgit
 Josef Bierbichler - Löschenkohl
 Simon Schwarz - Berti
 Stipe Erceg - Evgenjew
 Pia Hierzegger - Alexandra Horvath
 Christoph Luser - Paul
 Dorka Gryllus - Valeria
 Ivan Shvedoff - Igor

External links

References

2000s crime comedy films
2000s comedy thriller films
2009 films
Austrian crime comedy films
Films based on Austrian novels
Films based on crime novels
2009 comedy films